Carbisdale Castle was built in 1907 for the Duchess of Sutherland on a hill across the Kyle of Sutherland from Invershin in the Scottish Highlands. Until 2011 it was used as a youth hostel, operated by the Scottish Youth Hostels Association. The castle is in the Scots Baronial style, and is protected as a category B listed building. In April 2016, the asking price was lowered to £900,000, and a sale was completed in September 2016. The buyers are FCFM Group Ltd who stated they intended to make it "a world-class private residence". In April 2021 it was reported that the castle was again for sale, priced at £1.5 million.

History
The castle was built between 1905 and 1917 for Mary Caroline, Duchess of Sutherland, the second wife of George Sutherland-Leveson-Gower, 3rd Duke of Sutherland, whom she married in 1889. She is better known as "Duchess Blair" because of her first marriage to Captain Arthur Kindersely Blair of the 71st Highland Light Infantry, who died in a hunting accident in 1883 near Pitlochry. The marriage was not well liked in the Sutherland family. When the Duke died in 1892 his will, in favour of the Duchess, was contested by his son and heir Cromartie. In a court process that followed, the Duchess was found guilty of destroying documents in attempt of securing the inheritance and was imprisoned for six weeks in Holloway Prison, London.

Eventually, the Sutherland family came to an agreement giving Duchess Blair a substantial financial settlement. Furthermore, the family agreed to build a castle for the Duchess, as long as it was outside of the Sutherland lands. The Duchess employed a firm of Ayrshire builders and work started in 1906 just outside the Sutherland lands in Ross-shire. It was located on a hillside to be visible to a large part of Sutherland, especially the main road and rail line which the Sutherland family would have to use to travel south. Thus it became known as the "Castle of Spite" as it was widely considered that the Duchess located the castle there to spite her husband's family and the settlement agreement. This is further supported by the fact that the castle's tower only has clocks on three of its four faces - the side facing Sutherland is blank, supposedly because the Duchess did not wish to give the time of day to her former relatives.

Colonel Theodore Salvesen, a wealthy Scottish businessman of Norwegian extraction, bought the castle in 1933. He provided the castle as a safe refuge for King Haakon VII of Norway and Crown Prince Olav, who would later become King Olav V, during the Nazi occupation of Norway in World War II. During that time the castle was also used to hold important meetings. King Haakon VII made an agreement at the Carbisdale Conference on 22 June 1941, that the Russian forces, should they enter Norwegian territory, would not stay there after the war. Three years later, on 25 October 1944, the Red Army entered Norway and captured thirty towns, but later withdrew according to the terms of the agreement. After the Colonel died his son, Captain Harold Salvesen, inherited the castle and gave its contents and estate to the Scottish Youth Hostels Association. Carbisdale Castle Youth Hostel opened to members on 2 June 1945.

Following frost damage, the hostel closed for repairs in February 2011. Further structural damage was discovered, and over £2 million has been spent on repairs.

Towards the end of 2014, Carbisdale Castle was advertised for sale by the SYHA, and 17 marble sculptures and 36 19th Century paintings were put up for sale at a London auction in May 2015, raising £1million for the SYHA. A sale to FCFM Group Ltd was completed in September 2016 but was placed for sale again in April 2021. The Castle was then taken down, before being put back up for sale in early 2022.

Architecture

There is a secret door below the Great Staircase which could be opened by rotating one of the statues. This mechanism is no longer in use. Until its closure, the castle had a large collection of art, with some pieces dating back to the year 1680, as well as the Italian marble statues.

References

External links

 Carbisdale Castle, archived from Scottish Youth Hostels Association web site
 History of Carbisdale Castle, archived from carbisdale.org

Castles in Highland (council area)
Buildings and structures in Sutherland
Country houses in Highland (council area)
Category B listed buildings in Highland (council area)
Listed castles in Scotland
!!
Tourist attractions in Highland (council area)
Hostels
Reportedly haunted locations in Scotland